Louise Mason may refer to:

 Blonde Phantom, a fictional masked crime fighter in comic books published by Marvel Comics